"I'm Losing My Mind Over You" is a 1945 song by Al Dexter and His Troopers.  The song was Al Dexter's fifth release as well as his fifth number one on the Folk/Juke Box charts.  The B-side of the song, entitled, "I'll Wait For You Dear" peaked at number two on the same chart.

References

1945 songs
1945 singles
Songs written by Al Dexter